University of Minnesota Hospital may refer to:

 University of Minnesota Children's Hospital, on west bank of the Mississippi River in Minneapolis
 University of Minnesota Medical Center, the main university hospital for the University of Minnesota Medical School, located in Minneapolis
 University of Minnesota Veterinary Teaching Hospital
 University of Minnesota Veterinary Medical Center's Small Animal Hospital